Grafton Ifill III (born November 10 1985) is a Bahamian sprinter from Nassau, Bahamas who competed in the 100m and 200m. He attended St. Augustine's College in Nassau, Bahamas before going on to compete for Penn State.

He is remembered in the Bahamas for defeating Usain Bolt at the 2001 CARIFTA Games over 200m. Bolt would go on to dominate at the Jr Level there after.  

Ifill is now the deputy of the National Sports Authority in the Bahamas.

Personal bests

References

External links
 World Athletics
 Penn Athletics

1985 births
Living people
Bahamian male sprinters
People from Nassau, Bahamas
Sportspeople from Nassau, Bahamas
Pennsylvania State University alumni
Penn State Nittany Lions men's track and field athletes